Siklós is the 4th largest town in Baranya county, Hungary. The Malkocs Bey Mosque was built by the order of the Malkoçoğlu family.

Notable people
George Mikes, British author most famous for his humorous commentaries on various countries
Albert Siklós, composer
Rudolphus de Benyovszky, violinist and composer

Twin towns – sister cities

Siklós is twinned with:
 Aiud, Romania
 Donji Miholjac, Croatia
 Feldbach, Austria
 Fornovo di Taro, Italy
 Moldava nad Bodvou, Slovakia

Gallery

References

External links

 in Hungarian
Castle of Siklós
Programs of Siklós
All about Siklós Card

Populated places in Baranya County
Baranya (region)
History of Baranya (region)
Kán (genus)
Serb communities in Hungary